Józef Kiszkurno (1 February 1895 – 8 February 1981) was a Polish sports shooter. He competed in the trap event at the 1952 Summer Olympics.

References

1895 births
1981 deaths
People from Barysaw District
People from Minsk Governorate
Polish male sport shooters
Olympic shooters of Poland
Shooters at the 1952 Summer Olympics
People from the Russian Empire of Polish descent
Home Army members
Knights of the Order of Polonia Restituta
Recipients of the Gold Cross of Merit (Poland)
20th-century Polish people